The Institut français de Florence or French Institute in Florence is an Institut français in Florence, Italy. It is a French public institution attached to the French Foreign Ministry. The promotion of French culture and language overseas is its main mission.

See also

 Alliance Française
 Institut français

References

External links

 

France–Italy relations
French-language education
French culture
Francophonie
Institut Français
Education in Florence
International cultural organizations
Language advocacy organizations
Language education organizations
1907 establishments in Italy
Organizations established in 1907
Language education in Italy